Trissodoris is a genus of moth in the family Cosmopterigidae.

Species
Trissodoris euphaedra (Lower, 1904) (Australia)
Trissodoris honorariella (Walsingham, 1907) (Australia, Japan, New Guinea, Pacific Islands, Sri Lanka)
Trissodoris pansella Bradley, 1957 (Solomon Islands)
Trissodoris thelma Clarke, 1971 (French Polynesia)

References
Meyrick, 1914 . J. Bombay nat. Hist. Soc. 22 : 775
Natural History Museum Lepidoptera genus database

Cosmopteriginae
Taxa named by Edward Meyrick
Moth genera